The 2013 World 3D Archery Championships was the 6th edition of the World Archery Championships in 3D archery. The event was held in Italy between October 7–12.

Winners

Men

Women

References

External links
 Results

World 3D Archery Championships
World Championship
World Archery
International archery competitions hosted by Italy